In the United States, a number of ships whose construction was authorized during World War I entered service at a time when the post-war cutbacks in funds and personnel seriously curtailed American peacetime naval operations. The Navy established the rotating reserve to maintain a force in readiness. In operation, the system required that one-third of a given force remain alongside, maintained by only the minimum number of officers and soldiers, while another third was to be half-staffed and berthed at a buoy in the harbor. The last third was fully staffed and remained at buoys in the harbor but were for periodic operations underway at sea.

United States Navy